John Herbert Turner (May 7, 1834 – December 9, 1923) was a British Columbia politician.  Born in Claydon, Suffolk, England, Turner moved to British North America and worked as a merchant in Halifax and Charlottetown. In 1862 he moved to Victoria, on Vancouver Island, and founded Turner, Beeton and Co., which was involved in salmon canning, insurance and finance, importing and wholesaling.

Turner entered politics serving as mayor of Victoria from 1876 to 1881 and entered the provincial legislature in 1886 in the constituency of Victoria City. He served as minister of finance under successive premiers from 1887 to 1895 and as the 11th premier of British Columbia from 1895 to 1898. From 1901 to 1915 he was the province's representative in London where he retired. He died in Richmond in 1923.

References
 

1834 births
1923 deaths
Canadian Anglicans
English emigrants to pre-Confederation British Columbia
Premiers of British Columbia
People from Mid Suffolk District
Mayors of Victoria, British Columbia